"Half Measures" is the twelfth and penultimate episode of the third season of the American television drama series Breaking Bad, and the 32nd overall episode of the series. It originally aired on AMC in the United States on June 6, 2010.

Plot 

Skyler White pushes Walt to accept her plan of laundering his drug money through the car wash. They continue to disagree but are able to negotiate a plan that allows Walt to have some family dinners at home as a ploy to make the Whites appear reconciled. Meanwhile, Jesse Pinkman begins to plot against those who killed Combo Ortega. He buys blue meth from the gang responsible, confirming that Combo's killers work for Gus Fring. Jesse tells Walt and asks him to make ricin to exact revenge. Although Walt appears troubled by the gang's use of children, he dismisses the plan. Jesse says, "I’m doing it. With or without you."

Convinced Jesse is likely to do something rash, Walt visits Saul Goodman and they plan to have Jesse jailed, albeit briefly, to cool down. Meanwhile, Marie Schrader wheels Hank out of the hospital, after betting she can arouse him during a sponge bath.
Mike Ehrmantraut makes an unannounced visit to Walt at home, explaining Saul's plan is not feasible, and that Gus is unaware of Jesse's intentions, but will "take it as a problem." A former Philly cop, Mike laments over showing mercy to a burly, continually abusive drunkard, who killed his tiny, frail wife. Mike tells Walt he chose a "half measure" instead of killing the husband, and warns: "No more half measures."

Jesse plants ricin in burgers intended for Combo's killers, and Wendy, a local prostitute, attracts two of Gus' street dealers. However, Mike and Victor stop Jesse and bring him to a meeting with Gus, Walt, and the two targeted dealers. After tense negotiations, the dealers agree to stop using children as pawns, and Jesse agrees to "keep the peace." Later Jesse will not return Walt's phone calls.

That night, Tomás is killed, and Jesse and his girlfriend Andrea rush to the scene. He realizes the two street dealers have killed Tomás as he is no longer of value to them. During dinner with his family, Walt learns the same news on TV and abruptly leaves. Jesse, in his car, near their territory, watches them and snorts methamphetamine for the first time since rehab. He grabs a gun from under his seat and slowly approaches the two dealers. As Jesse draws his gun, the dealers do likewise. Suddenly, Walt plows into both dealers with his car, killing one and badly injuring the other. Walt gets out of his car, picks up the injured dealer's gun, and shoots him dead.

Walt then tells an utterly shocked Jesse one word: "Run.".

Reception 
Aaron Paul won the Primetime Emmy Award for Outstanding Supporting Actor in a Drama Series for his performance in this episode.

This episode received widely positive reviews from critics. In IGN's review, the episode is called "fun, creative, well-directed, well-acted and set us up for what's going to be an awesome finale", and was given a 9.7 rating.

In 2019, The Ringer ranked "Half Measures" as the 15th best out of the 62 total Breaking Bad episodes.

References

External links 
"Half Measures" at the official Breaking Bad site

2010 American television episodes
Breaking Bad (season 3) episodes
Television episodes written by Peter Gould